The 2015 Australian National Handball Championship is split into three stages. Stage one was held in Brisbane early August for Under 21 & Under 18 titles. Stage two in Canberra mid August for the Youth Championships. Stage three will be in Perth during October for the Open titles.

The Under 18 Boy's was won by Queensland as no other teams turned up. They ended up playing in the Under 21 men's competition which was won by
Queensland Under 21 over New South Wales with the Queensland Under 18's third. The Under 18's women saw Queensland beat the Australian Capital Territory on goal difference after they were locked at one win each and two draw's.

The Under 16 Boy's was won easily by Queensland three legs to zero over New South Wales. In the Under 16 Girl's, New South Wales won a tense final against Australian Capital Territory A. Queensland came third with Australian Capital Territory B fourth.

The senior nationals took place in Perth, Western Australia. Victoria defeated hosts Western Australia in the men's Gold Medal match with New South Wales taking the bronze. Current champions Queensland did not compete. In the women's, Victoria defeated a combined Queensland and South Australian team in the gold medal match. In the bronze medal match, hosts Western Australia defeated New South Wales.

Senior Nationals

Men

Final

Bronze playoff

Women

Final

Bronze playoff

Junior Indoor Results

Under 21 Women

Final

 Third placed team - Australian Capital Territory

Under 21 Men

Final

 Third placed team - Queensland Under 18's

Under 18 Girls

Youth Championship

Under 16 Boy's

Under 16 Girls

Final

 Third placed team - Queensland
 Fourth placed team - Australian Capital Territory B

References

2015 in Australian sport
Handball competitions in Australia
2015 in handball